Mérignac is a commune in the Gironde department in Nouvelle-Aquitaine in southwestern France. The 20th-century historian Robert Étienne (1921–2009) was born in Mérignac.

It is the largest suburb of the city of Bordeaux and adjoins it to the west. It is a member of the Bordeaux Métropole.

Mérignac is the site of Bordeaux International Airport.

Etymology
The name Mérignac derives from the Gallo-Roman word Matriniacus, name of a villa rustica (countryside villa) that was the origin of today's town.

Population

Sights
 Tour de Veyrines : Veyrines Dungeon.
 Château Bourran : Bourran Castle
 Château Le Burck : Le Burck Castle
 Château or Maison Noble du Parc or d'Espagne : Parc Castle or Spain Castle
 Fontaine d'Arlac : Arlac Fountain
 Immeuble Gillet : Gillet Building
 La glacière : the icehouse
 La vieille église : the old Roman church
Maison carrée d'Arlac : Peychotte's folly (Square House) in Arlac

Parks and gardens
 Parc de Bourran :
 Bois du Burck : Burck wood
 Parc de Mérignac :
 Parc Saint-Exupéry :
 Parc du Vivier : the wood around the city hall

Education
The commune has about 5,000 students in the primary and secondary schools in its city. Schools include:
15 public and private preschools
15 public and private elementary schools
Four junior high schools: Collège de Bourran, Collège de Capeyron, Collège Jules-Ferry, Collège des Eyquems
Two senior high schools: Lycée Fernand Daguin and Lycée professionnel Marcel Dassault

Twin towns – sister cities

Mérignac is twinned with:
 Saint-Laurent, Quebec, Canada
 Kaolack, Senegal
 Vilanova i la Geltrú, Spain

See also
 Aéroport de Bordeaux Mérignac
Communes of the Gironde department

Notable inhabitants
Albert Dupouy (1901 - 1973): player of rugby to death in Mérignac
Jean Samazeuilh (1891 - 1965): French tennis player dead in Mérignac
Nicolas Canteloup, born on November 4, 1963 in Mérignac in the Gironde, is a comedian, French imitator.
Émile Rummelhardt former professional player and French football coach.

References

External links

Official website 
 Official website  (Archive)

Communes of Gironde